Charles or Charlie Fox may refer to:

Politicians
Charles James Fox (1749–1806), British politician 
Charles Fox (1660–1713), British politician, Paymaster of the Forces
Charles N. Fox (1829–1903), California Supreme Court Justice
Charles Fox (socialist activist) (1861–1939), British socialist activist and dentist
Charles L. Fox (1854–1927), American artist, philanthropist and socialist from Maine

Engineers
Charles Douglas Fox (1840–1921), British civil engineer
Charles Fox (engineer, born 1810) (1810–1874), British civil and railway engineer, built the Crystal Palace

Sports
Charlie Fox (baseball) (Charles Francis Fox, 1921–2004), American baseball manager, scout, coach, and athlete
Chas Fox (born 1963), American football player
Charles Fox (cricketer) (1858–1901), English cricketer
Charlie Fox (footballer) (born 1998), English footballer
Charlie Fox (rugby union) (1898–1984), Australian rugby union player
Charles Fox (swimmer) (born 1948), Zambian Olympic swimmer

Musicians
Inez and Charlie Foxx (1939–1998), American musicians
Charles Fox (jazz critic) (1921–1991), British jazz critic
Charles Fox (composer) (born 1940), film and television composer

Others
Charles Fox (artist) (1794–1849), English artist
Charles Richard Fox (1796–1873), illegitimate son of Henry Richard Vassall-Fox, 3rd Baron Holland 
Charles Fox (scientist) (1797–1878), British scientist
Charles James Fox (editor) (1827–1903), newspaper editor and owner in Australia
Charles Masson Fox (1866–1935), Cornish businessman and chess player
Charles Vincent Fox (1877–1928), British army officer and rower
Charles Fox (missionary) (1878–1977), English ethnographer and missionary
Charles Eli Fox (1879–1926), American architect, partner in the Chicago firm of Marshall and Fox
Charles Fox (mathematician) (1897–1977), British-born mathematician
Irving Resnikoff, alias "Charles J. Fox" (1897–1988), Russian-born portrait painter based in New York
Chappie Fox (Charles Philip Fox, 1913–2003), circus historian and philanthropist
Charles R. Fox (1912–2006), American major general
Charley Fox (Charles W. Fox, 1920–2008), Canadian Air Force officer in WWII

See also
Charles Foxe (died 1590), English politician, MP for Much Wenlock and Ludlow